Christine Comaford is an American businesswoman, author and serial entrepreneur. She has founded and sold five businesses including Artemis Ventures and First Professional Bank, which was acquired by Union Bank. Comaford has been a board member for more than 36 start-ups and has invested in over 200 companies.

She is a Leadership and Culture Coach with SmartTribes Institute, which she founded in order to help leaders navigate growth and change. Her institute specializes in Neuroleadership Training. She created OneTribe Foundation, a charitable foundation that donates 5% of SmartTribes Institute's annual revenue to charitable causes each year.

In addition, Christine is the host of her own podcast.

Career
In the 1980s, Comaford began working for Microsoft where she wrote testing applications for OS/2 and was a software engineer for Windows 3.0. She did software engineering for Lotus Software and Adobe Systems, was DBA at Apple Inc., and worked as a strategy adviser for Oracle corporation and Symantec. In 1982, Comaford founded First Professional Bank, which was later sold to Union Bank. She founded Kuvera Associates, a consulting company, which merged into Corporate Computing, another company founded by Comaford in 1991. Corporate Computing was sold to LBMS in 1995 and merged with Computer Associates. In 1997, she founded Planet U which delivered internet based promotions across the internet and sold her shares to Rupert Murdoch’s News Corp. In 1999, she founded Artemis Ventures, which later merged with Novus Ventures.

In 2002, Comaford invested in Google, prior to the company’s initial public offering. She has served on the board of advisers or directors for over 36 start-up companies. She has been angel investor or venture capitalist for over 200 start-ups. Comaford was recognized as one of the "50 Human Behavior Experts to Follow" by iMotions.

Comaford has provided coaching and consultations for a wide variety of businesses, including Microsoft, Plymouth Foam, Nestle Purina, Forward, GoPro, SIGNAL, Principal Auto, Trans-Phos, Server Technology, Model 55, Baxter, and TELAID She provides intensive workshops based on her work in the field of neuroscience, as well as keynote addresses with titles such as Guarantee Growth, Create the Culture of your Dreams, Quota Busters, and Influence Any Outcome.

Personal life
Comaford is a follower of Buddhism.

Writing
Comaford wrote the book Rules for Renegades in 2007, which was a best seller on the New York Times, Wall Street Journal, Amazon, and USA Today bestseller lists. She authored SmartTribes: How Teams Become Brilliant Together, a book about making teams more productive via neuroscience, in 2013. The book was a best seller on the New York Times, Amazon, and other lists. Comaford wrote a software development column for PC Week for five years. Comaford published Power Your Tribe: Create Resilient Teams in Turbulent Times. After being released in 2018 it became a Wall Street Journal and USA Today Best Seller.

She has written for Fast Company, Forbes, Inc., Convention Forum, Great Leadership Blog, Leadership Insights, The Smart Manager Magazine, The CEO Magazine, and HVACR Business.

Other activities
Comaford worked on developing and implementing the U.S. intranet strategy under the Bill Clinton administration which allowed citizens to access government services through the internet. She helped pass a $4 billion bill through Congress to benefit the Small Business Administration’s SBIC program.

She has spoken at numerous events including Premiere Speakers Bureau, TEDxSanDiego, The Art Of, and Customer Experience Exchange, as well as YPO Education Program chapters. She has been on SAP Radio, and has delivered lectures on entrepreneurship for Harvard University, Stanford University, UCLA, and UC Berkeley.

Comaford has appeared on Good Morning America, CNN, CNBC, MSNBC, PBS, CNET, Fox Business News, The Fast Leader Show, C-Suite Network, and Talk Business 360 TV. She has also been featured on a variety of podcasts and radio shows, such as: Think Outrageous Radio Show, Experience Pros, The Fast Leader Show, Year of the Peer Podcast, My Quick Coach, Predictive ROI, Engaging Leader Podcast, Eliances Heroes Radio Show, 77WABC Mind Your Business, and WorkLife Hub.

References

Living people
American women writers
American Buddhists
American women in business
Year of birth missing (living people)
OS/2 people
21st-century American women